Calliotropis stellaris is a species of sea snail, a marine gastropod mollusk in the family Eucyclidae.

Description

Distribution
This marine species occurs off the Philippines.

References

 Lee, Y.C. & Wu, W.L., 2001. Four new bathyal Trochidae (Mollusca: Gastropoda) from Indo-Pacific region. Memoir Malacological Society of Taiwan 1:10–13

External links

stellaris
Gastropods described in 2001